Urraca ( 1080 – 8 March 1126), called the Reckless (la Temeraria), was Queen of León, Castile and Galicia from 1109 until her death. She claimed the imperial title as suo jure Empress of All Spain and Empress of All Galicia.

Early years 

Urraca was born to King Alfonso VI of León and Castile and Constance of Burgundy. Constance—Alfonso's second wife—was closely related to the French royal family and the influential Burgundian abbot Hugh of Cluny was her maternal uncle. As Constance was also related to her husband's first wife, Agnes of Aquitaine, Pope Gregory VII only confirmed their marriage after Alfonso agreed to replace the traditional Mozarabic liturgy in his realms with the Roman Rite. The place and date of Urraca's birth are unknown, but she was born likely in Sahagún or León around 1080, probably in 1081. Although she was her parents' sole child, her childhood is poorly documented. She would mention one Presbyter Pedro and a certain Domingo Falcóniz, two otherwise unknown clergymen, as her tutors in her royal diplomas. Her relationship with her paternal aunt Elvira was obviously close, as it is demonstrated by Elvira's appointment as guardian of Urraca's daughter Sancha Raimúndez. A late source, Rodrigo Jiménez de Rada, claims that the powerful aristocrat Pedro Ansúrez and his wife Elo Alfónsez raised Urraca in their household, but no contemporaneous document confirms this report.

First marriage and widowhood 

Urraca was married to Raymond of Burgundy. Unlike her mother, who was a member of the ruling house of the Duchy of Burgundy, her husband descended from the rulers of the neighbouring County of Burgundy. Raymond was also the brother-in-law of Urraca's maternal cousin Duke Odo I of Burgundy and Odo's brother Henry. The Muslim Almoravids inflicted a heavy defeat on Alfonso VI at Sagrajas in 1086 and Urraca's marriage to Raymond was part of Alfonso's diplomatic strategy to attract cross-Pyrenees alliances. The first authentic document mentioning Urraca as Raymond's wife, a letter of grant to one Hermenegildo Rodríguez, was issued on 22 February 1093, but interpolated documents refer to them as husband and wife already before 1088. Historians Ángel Gordo Molina and Diego Melo Carrasco propose that Raymond wed Urraca likely before early 1090 when royal diplomas first present them as rulers of the "Land of Saint James", or Galicia.

Raymond reached the age of majority by the time of the marriage, but Alfonso VI continued to control the administration of Galicia. His representative in Galicia, Pedro Vimaraz, died around the time of the wedding and Alfonso appointed Arias Diaz as his successor. A talented young clergyman, Diego Gelmírez, was made the "chancellor and secretary" of Raymond and Urraca with Alfonso's consent. On the other hand, Raymond and Urraca became involved in the administration of other provinces as well. For instance, they witnessed charters on the occasion of the repopulation of Ávila, Segovia, Salamanca and Zamora. In 1093 Urraca's mother died and Alfonso's Moorish concubine Zaida of Seville gave birth to a son, Sancho Alfónsez. The birth of her illegitimate brother jeopardized Urraca's position as their father's sole heir. The power base of Raymond and Urraca weakened even more when Alfonso granted the "Land of Portugal" to his illegitimate daughter Theresa and her husband Henry of Burgundy around 1094. 

As a woman, Urraca was under the tutelage of her husband. Raymond was mentioned at the first place in almost all documents issued during his rule as Count of Galicia. Two documents, both confirming privileges of the burghers of Santiago de Compostella, referred to her as "Queen Urraca" in 1095 and 1105. The use of the title may have expressed her resentment at her inferior position, although , or royal princesses, were occasionally styled queens in this period. Sancho Alfónsez was regularly mentioned in royal diplomas from 1103, showing that Alfonso VI regarded his only son as his heir, although most clerics opposed the succession of an illegitimate child. By March 1107, Sancho was elected king on his father's initiative. Raymond made preparations for a succession crisis through an alliance with their brother-in-law Henry of Portugal. Their treaty was confirmed in the presence of a high-ranking monk from the Abbey of Cluny late in 1105 or early in 1106. They agreed on the division of their father-in-law's realms without referring to Sancho's claims and Henry promised to rule his portion as Raymond's vassal.

Raymond fell seriously ill and died in Grajal de Campos in September 1107. The widowed Urraca took full responsibility of the administration of Galicia. She styled herself "empress of whole Galicia" in her letter of grant to the Lugo Cathedral late in 1107 or early in 1108. The Galician clerics and aristocrats regarded Urraca's infant son by Raymond, Alfonso Raimúndez, as Raymond's lawful successor. The boy's position as his father's heir was confirmed in their presence at an assembly in León by Alfonso VI. The King also acknowledged his grandson's right to rule Galicia in case of Urraca's remarriage. Around this time Urraca began a love affair with the Castilian aristocrat Gómez González. Sancho Alfónsez died fighting against the Almoravids at Uclés on 29 May 1108. After her half-brother's unexpected death, Urraca became their father's sole heir. Her new position was ceremoniously confirmed at an assembly of "almost all nobles and counts of Spain" shortly before her father died on 30 June or 1 July 1108.

Reign

Second marriage

Urraca succeeded her father as the first reigning queen in European history. Her earliest extant diploma, issued in favor of the León Cathedral a day after her father's funeral, referred to her as "queen of whole Spain". Prominent Leonese, Castilian and Galician aristocrats and twelve bishops witnessed the document, showing that her realm's elite acknowledged her as lawful monarch. Two early sources—the Chronicle of Sahagún and the —attribute the proposal about Urraca's marriage to Alfonso I, King of Aragon and Navarre, to the Leonese aristocrats. They were reportedly convinced that a female monarch would be unable to rule and defend the kingdom against the Almoravids and forced Urraca to marry to "the bloodthirsty and cruel Aragonese tyrant" against her will. Bernard of Sédirac, Archbishop of Toledo, raised objections against the marriage, emphasizing that Urraca and Alfonso were cousins. In contrast with the two chronicles, Rodrigo Jiménez de Rada writes that Alfonso VI started the negotiations about his heir's marriage with Alfonso I because he wanted to prevent Urraca's marriage with her lover, Gómez González. Gordo Molina and Melo Carrasc propose that both reports could be reliable, because the selection of a suitable husband for his daughter and heir was the elderly King's most important task before his death.

Alfonso I married Urraca in the castle of Monzón in October or November 1109. In December, Urraca granted her "whole land that used to be" her father's to her husband whom she mentioned as "lord and my spouse". In the same document, she stipulated that Alfonso should respect her "like a good husband his good wife" and he could not request the annulment of their marriage referring to their kinship or excommunication. The document confirmed the right of Urraca's son by her first marriage to inherit León in case the couple died without issue. The Galician aristocrats' traditional desire for independence awakened and they used the defense of Alfonso Raimúndez's right to rule Galicia and succeed his mother as a pretext for a rebellion. After their leader Pedro Fróilaz de Traba announced that Urraca had lost her claim to rule Galicia when re-marrying, they proclaimed Alfonso Raimúndez king. Pedro Arias, Pedro Gudesteiz and other Galician nobles who remained loyal to Urraca formed a brotherhood against Pedro Fróilaz and his allies. They offered the leadership to Diego Gelmírez, who had been elevated to Bishop of Compostella, but Gelmírez remained neutral in the conflict. Alfonso I and Urraca invaded Galicia and seized the important castle of Monterroso, but reports of the cruelty of the Aragonese troops outraged the Leonese aristocrats. The relationship between Alfonso I and the high clergy grew tense. The bishop of Palencia was imprisoned, the archbishop of Toledo, the bishops of Burgos and León and the abad of Sahagún were forced to flee. 

The marriage proved unfortunate. Alfonso's prejudice against women is well documented and he disliked Urraca's son. She disdained her husband for his superstitious nature, in particular for his fear of ravens and crows, and he killed a Galician noble who had sought Urraca's protection in Monterroso during their campaign in Galicia. Her husband regularly shamed her in the royal court and often went as far as beating and kicking her in public. Urraca's letter of grant to the Abbey of Santo Domingo de Silos is the earliest attestation to her will to get rid of her husband's tutelage. In the document, she styled herself as "queen of whole Spain and daughter of Emperor Alfonso" on 13 June 1110. The exact circumstances of Urraca's separation from her husband are uncertain. According to contemporaneous sources, she left Alfonso after consulting with her advisors. Rodrigo Jiménez de Rada writes that Alfonso repudiated her for her infidelity leaving her "free to do whatever she pleased". The last document mentioning Urraca in her second husband's company was issued on 22 May 1112.

The marriage of Urraca and Alfonso almost immediately sparked rebellions in Galicia and scheming by her illegitimate half-sister Theresa and brother-in-law Henry, the countess and count of Portugal. Also, they believed that the new marriage of Urraca could put in jeopardy the rights of the son of her first marriage, Alfonso Raimúndez. One of the first acts of the new spouses was to sign a pact under which the monarchs granted to each other soberana potestas over the other's kingdom, declaring heir of both their future children, and in the case that the union was childless, the surviving spouse would succeed the other one in the throne.

From the start, the Galician faction was divided in two tendencies: one headed by Archbishop Diego Gelmírez of Santiago de Compostela (who defended the position of Alfonso Raimúndez as Urraca's successor) and another led by Count Pedro Fróilaz de Traba, tutor of the young prince (who was inclined to the complete independence of Galicia under the rule of Alfonso). A third group of opposition to the royal marriage was at the court and was headed by Count Gómez González, whose motivation against Urraca and Alfonso I of Aragon could have been his fear of losing power, a sensation soon confirmed when Alfonso I appointed Aragonese and Navarrese nobles for important public posts and as holders of fortresses.

From Galicia, the count of Traba began the first aggressive movement against the monarchs reclaiming the hereditary rights of Alfonso Raimúndez. In response to the Galician rebellion, Alfonso I of Aragon marched with his army to Galicia and in 1110, reestablished the order there after defeating the local troops in Monterroso Castle. The Galician rebellion against the royal power was only the beginning of a series of political and military conflicts which, with the complete opposite personalities of Urraca and Alfonso I and their mutual dislike, gave rise to a continuous civil war in the Hispanic kingdoms over the following years. Urraca did not share the governance of her realms with her husband.

As their relationship soured, Urraca accused Alfonso of physical abuse, and by May 1110 she separated from Alfonso. In addition to her objections to Alfonso's handling of rebels, the couple had a falling-out over his execution of one of the rebels who had surrendered to the queen, to whom the queen was inclined to be merciful. Additionally, as Urraca was married to someone many in the kingdom objected to, the queen's son and heir became a rallying point for opponents to the marriage.

Estrangement between husband and wife escalated from discrete and simmering hostilities into open armed warfare between the Leonese-Castilians and the Aragonese. An alliance between Alfonso of Aragon and Henry of Portugal culminated in the 1111 Battle of Candespina in which Urraca's lover and chief supporter Gómez González was killed. He was soon replaced in both roles by another count, Pedro González de Lara, who took up the fight and would father at least two further children by Urraca. By the fall of 1112 a truce was brokered between Urraca and Alfonso with their marriage annulled. Though Urraca recovered Asturias, Leon, and Galicia, Alfonso occupied a significant portion of Castile (where Urraca enjoyed large support), while her half-sister Theresa and her husband Count Henry of Portugal occupied Zamora and Extremadura. Recovering these regions and expanding into Muslim lands would occupy much of Urraca's foreign policy. Despite the annulment of their marriage (on the grounds of consanguinity), Alfonso continued his efforts for political control. While Urraca was engaged in this battle, she also had to contend with the schemes of her sister, who promoted a plan to replace the queen by her son. This particular incident, ended in a compromise between the two sisters where Theresa was granted a vast territory in Leon in exchange for agreeing that she was Urraca's vassal.

According to author Bernard F. Reilly, the measure of success for Urraca’s rule was her ability to restore and protect the integrity of her inheritance – that is, the kingdom of her father – and transmit that inheritance in full to her own heir. Policies and events pursued by Alfonso VI – namely legitimizing her brother and thereby providing an opportunity for her illegitimate half-sister to claim a portion of the patrimony, as well as the forced marriage with Alfonso I of Aragon – contributed in large part to the challenges Urraca faced upon her succession. Additionally, the circumstance of Urraca’s gender added a distinctive role-reversal dimension to diplomacy and politics, which Urraca used to her advantage.

Character 

Urraca is characterized in the Historia Compostelana as prudent, modest, and with good sense. According to Reilly, the Historia Compostelana also attributes her "failings" to her gender, "the weakness and changeability of women, feminine perversity, and calls her a Jezebel" for her liaisons with her leading magnates, with at least one relationship producing an illegitimate son. These observations were hardly neutral or dispassionate, according to Reilly, who wrote: "[T]here is no question that the queen is in control, perhaps all too much in control, of events."

Death and legacy 

As queen, Urraca rose to the challenges presented to her and her solutions were pragmatic ones, according to Reilly, and laid the foundation for the reign of her son Alfonso VII, who in spite of the opposition of Urraca's lover Pedro González de Lara succeeded to the throne of a kingdom whole and at peace at Urraca’s death in 1126. The queen's reign also served as the legal precedent for the reigns of future queens.

Family 

Urraca's firstborn child by Raymond, Sancha, was born before 11 November 1095. She was named for Urraca's paternal grandmother Sancha of León who transmitted the claim to rule the Kingdom of León to her children. He was named for Urraca's father.

Urraca had two illegitimate children with her lover Pedro González de Lara: Fernando Pérez Hurtado (c.1114-1156), and Elvira Pérez de Lara (c.1112-1174), who is mentioned in the Historia Compostelana in connection with her donation of the village of Arquillinos to Diego Gelmírez. Elvira would twice wed, first to García Pérez de Traba, lord of Trastámara and son of Pedro Fróilaz de Traba, then to count Beltrán de Risnel.

References

Sources

Further reading

External links

Reilly, Bernard F. The Medieval Spains, 1993.

|-

Hispanic empresses and queens
1079 births
1126 deaths
12th-century Castilian monarchs
House of Jiménez
Leonese infantas
Castilian infantas
12th-century Galician monarchs
12th-century Leonese monarchs
Queens regnant in Europe
Navarrese royal consorts
12th-century Spanish women
12th-century women rulers
Burials in the Royal Pantheon at the Basilica of San Isidoro
Deaths in childbirth
Daughters of emperors
Empresses regnant